Sabkhat Matti is a dry lake on the border between Saudi Arabia and the United Arab Emirates. "Sabka" means "salt flat" in Arabic. In the 1930s, Bedouins told western surveyors that the salt flats were named after someone named "Matti", who had disappeared while trying to cross them.

Lakes of Saudi Arabia
Lakes of the United Arab Emirates
Salt flats
Saudi Arabia–United Arab Emirates border
International lakes of Asia